A. pentaphylla may refer to:

 Adesmia pentaphylla, a flowering plant
 Asterias pentaphylla, a brittle star